The Worthing Saga (1990) is a science fiction book by American writer Orson Scott Card, set in the Worthing series.  It is made up of the novel The Worthing Chronicle (1982) and nine related stories. Six of the stories are from Card's short story collection Capitol (1979) and the other three are early works, two of them previously unpublished.

Story list
The stories in this book are:

The Worthing Chronicle (1982) - novel
Tales of Capitol (1979)
"Skipping Stones" (1979)
"Second Chance" (1979)
"Lifeloop" (1979)
"Breaking the Game" (1979)
"Killing Children" (1979)
"And What Will We Do Tomorrow?" (1979)
Tales from the Forest of Waters
"Worthing Farm" (1990) - previously unpublished
"Worthing Inn" (1990) - previously unpublished
"The Tinker" (1980) - first published in Eternity SF

Character list
Ordered from oldest to youngest by non-relative age
 Mother
 Herman Nuber
 Abner Doon
 Jason Worthing
 Justice
 Lared

See also

Capitol
Hot Sleep
The Worthing Chronicle
List of works by Orson Scott Card

External links
 About the book The Worthing Saga from Card's website

1990 short story collections
Short story collections by Orson Scott Card
Novels by Orson Scott Card
Tor Books books
Religion in science fiction